Discovery is the ninth studio album by English multi-instrumentalist and songwriter Mike Oldfield, released on 25 June 1984 on Virgin Records. It comprises a number of pop songs, most notably the single "To France", as well as the instrumental "The Lake".

Background and recording

After his 1983 tour, Oldfield relocated to Villars-sur-Ollon, Switzerland for tax purposes and started work on a new album. The album was recorded from January to June 1984. Sessions typically ran from 10:30 a.m. to around 7 p.m. each day. While living in Villars, Oldfield also composed the soundtrack to The Killing Fields (1984). Selections from the two were released as The 1984 Suite, in 2016.

The album contains a number of pop songs, which Oldfield had been encouraged by Virgin Records to write, following the success of "Moonlight Shadow" from his previous album, Crises.

The first track of the album, "To France", with Maggie Reilly on vocals, seamlessly continues into the second track, "Poison Arrows", sung by Barry Palmer.

According to Oldfield, the instrumental "The Lake" was inspired by his time in Switzerland and around Lake Geneva.

During 1984 Oldfield and his band embarked on a Europe wide tour in promotion of the album.

2016 reissue 
Discovery was re-released in a deluxe edition format on 29 January 2016, as per all previous albums which were originally released on the Virgin label.

The reissue comprises 2 CDs (Discovery and the 1984 Suite) and a DVD featuring 5.1 surround sound mixes. The 1984 Suite is a compilation album of Discovery and Oldfield's other 1984 album, The Killing Fields. It also includes two previously unreleased tracks: "The Royal Mile", a slight reworking of the 1984 track "Afghan", and "Zombies (Halloween Special)", a reworking of the song "Poison Arrows" with the original vocals replaced by a "Macintalk" voice named Fred and the lines "Somebody's out to get you" replaced with "Zombies are out to get you".

Recording and instruments 
Around the time of Discovery Oldfield had been seen using a Gibson SG Junior and a Les Paul Junior (including a modified 24 fret fretboard), along with a pair of Fender Stratocasters (red and sunburst). Oldfield also used guitar synthesizers on the album, utilising Roland's GR-300 and G-808 controller. The Roland G-88 bass synth controller is heavily used for bass guitar sounds on the album. It is likely that a mandolin made by Scottish-based luthier Mike Vanden is used in "To France". Among the acoustic guitars on the album, an Ovation Adamas was used. Oldfield's main compositional tool for the album was the Fairlight CMI. In addition to using its sequencing abilities he also used it as a sampler, for example with Maggie Reilly's voice on "The Lake".

Barry Palmer and Maggie Reilly did not meet until the album was finished even though they share vocal duties on "Tricks of the Light"; they recorded their vocals separately.

Sleeve photos 
The inner sleeve of the original vinyl LP featured candid photographs taken during the recording sessions. One of the photos, titled "Simon's notes", shows a handwritten list of tracks recorded during the sessions, some of which - such as "T'Sword" - may either have been released under different names or remain unreleased to this day.

Track listing 
All tracks by Mike Oldfield

Original LP
Side one
 "To France" – 4:37
 "Poison Arrows" – 3:57
 "Crystal Gazing" – 3:02
 "Tricks of the Light" – 3:52
 "Discovery" – 4:35

Side two
 "Talk About Your Life" – 4:24
 "Saved by a Bell" – 4:39
 "The Lake" – 12:10

2016 Deluxe Edition

Disc 1 - Discovery Remastered

 "To France"
 "Poison Arrows"
 "Crystal Gazing"
 "Tricks of the Light"
 "Discovery"
 "Talk About Your Life"
 "Saved by a Bell"
 "The Lake"
 "To France" (Extended version) (bonus track)
 "In the Pool" (bonus track)
 "Bones" (bonus track)
 "Afghan" (bonus track)
 "Tricks of the Light" (Instrumental) (bonus track)

Tracks 9-11 taken from the "To France" 12 inch single. Tracks 12-13 taken from B-side of "Tricks of the Light" single.

Disc 2 - The 1984 Suite CD

 "To France"
 "The Lake"
 "The Killing Fields (Main Theme)"
 "Étude"
 "The Royal Mile" (Re-discovered track)
 "Zombies (Halloween Special)" (Reworking of "Poison Arrows" with new vocal)
 "Discovery"

Disc 3 - DVD

The 1984 Suite in 5.1 Surround Sound
Promotional videos
 "To France"
 "Tricks of the Light"
 "Étude"

Personnel 
 Mike Oldfield – all instruments (except drums), producer
 Maggie Reilly – vocals 
 Barry Palmer – vocals 
 Simon Phillips – drums, producer
 Dan Kramer – cover photography

Cover versions 
The German electronic project Meteor Seven released the track "Signs of Life" featuring a vocal sample from the track "Talk About Your Life". The German techno hard dance band Scooter released a cover of the album track "Talk About Your Life" on their album Music for a Big Night Out.

Charts

Weekly charts

Year-end charts

Certifications

References

External links 
 Mike Oldfield Discography - Discovery at Tubular.net

Mike Oldfield albums
1984 albums
Virgin Records albums
Albums produced by Simon Phillips (drummer)